Tig Notaro: Boyish Girl Interrupted is the first hour-long comedy special from Tig Notaro that premiered on HBO on August 22, 2015. The special was recorded on May 31, 2015 at the Wilbur Theatre in Boston. In 2016, Tig’s record label Bentzen Ball Records and Secretly Canadian released an audio album version of the special on CD, download and vinyl. The album is dedicated to the memory of Susie Cusack, Tig’s mother.

Reception 

"The sound of her voice, located somewhere between dry and monotone, has an oddly calming affect," wrote Corinne Cummings at Rolling Stone magazine.

Awards 
The special was nominated at the 68th Primetime Emmy Awards for Outstanding Writing for a Variety Special in 2016.

In 2017, the album was nominated for the Grammy Award for Best Comedy Album at the 59th Annual Grammy Awards.

Album

Track listing

Credits
 Engineer – Bob Aldridge
 FOH Mixer – Jim Hores
 Pro Tools – Chris Prinzivalli
 A2 – Chris Van Drie

References 

Stand-up comedy concert films
2015 television specials
HBO network specials
Tig Notaro albums
Live comedy albums
Live albums by American artists
2010s comedy albums
Stand-up comedy albums
2010s spoken word albums
Spoken word albums by American artists
Live spoken word albums
2016 live albums
2016 video albums
Secretly Canadian live albums
Films shot in Boston